Freedom's Road  is the 19th studio album by American singer-songwriter and musician John Mellencamp, released in 2007. It debuted on the Billboard 200 at No. 5 in late January 2007, becoming the highest debuting album of Mellencamp's career. The song "Our Country" received significant exposure prior to the release of the album, as it was featured in frequently-aired commercials for Chevrolet trucks. The country band Little Big Town provides background vocals on eight songs on the album, including "Our Country."

Mellencamp intended for Freedom's Road to have a 1960s rock sound while still remaining contemporary, and he feels that goal was achieved. "We wanted to make sure that it had the same feeling of some of the great songs from the '60s but also had the message of today and had the backbeat of today. I think we came up with a pretty timeless sounding album," Mellencamp told his online radio station in late 2006.

Accolades
"Our Country" was nominated for Best Solo Rock Vocal Performance at the 50th Annual Grammy Awards (held February 10, 2008).

Track listing
All songs written by John Mellencamp.
 "Someday" – 3:08
 "Ghost Towns Along the Highway" – 4:40
 "The Americans" – 5:11
 "Forgiveness" – 4:30
 "Freedom's Road" – 4:19
 "Jim Crow" – 3:22
 "Our Country" – 3:47
 "Rural Route" – 3:08
 "My Aeroplane" – 4:41
 "Heaven Is a Lonely Place" – 4:32
 "Rodeo Clown" [hidden track after several minutes of silence] – 4:25

 "Ghost Towns Along The Highway" - acoustic (Best Buy exclusive)
 "Someday" - acoustic (Best Buy exclusive)
 "Rural Route" - acoustic (Best Buy exclusive)
 "The Americans" - rough mix (Best Buy exclusive)

Personnel
John Mellencamp – vocals, guitar
Dane Clark – drums, percussion
John Gunnell – bass
Troye Kinnett – keyboards
Miriam Sturm – violin
Mike Wanchic – guitars, vocals
Andy York – guitars, vocals, flute-a-phone
Joan Baez – vocal duet on "Jim Crow"
Little Big Town – backing vocals

Charts

References

External links
Official website

2007 albums
John Mellencamp albums
Republic Records albums